is a Japanese manga series by Imari Arita. It originally began serialization online via Twitter in February 2019. It has been then serialized in Square Enix's shōnen manga magazine Monthly Shōnen Gangan since August 2019 and has been collected in seven tankōbon volumes. An anime television series adaptation by Project No.9 aired from April to June 2022.

Characters

Media

Manga

Anime
An anime adaptation was announced in the July 2021 issue of Monthly Shōnen Gangan published on June 11, 2021. It was later revealed to be a television series produced by Project No.9. Kū Nabara directed the series, with scripts written by Deko Akao, character designs by Haruka Tanaka, and music composed by Satoshi Hōno and Ryūnosuke Kasai. It aired from April 7 to June 23, 2022, on AT-X, Tokyo MX, BS NTV, and BS Fuji. The opening theme song is "Cherish" by Kaori Ishihara, while the ending theme song is "Kikoeru?" ("Can You Hear Me?") by Maaya Uchida. Crunchyroll has licensed the series.

Episode list

Notes

References

External links
 Shachiku-san wa Yōjo Yūrei ni Iyasaretai at Monthly Shōnen Gangan 
  
 

2022 anime television series debuts
Anime series based on manga
Comedy anime and manga
Crunchyroll anime
Gangan Comics manga
Japanese webcomics
Project No.9
Shōnen manga
Supernatural anime and manga